Alon Goldstein (born 1970) is an Israeli classical pianist.

References

External links
Alon Goldstein's Blog
Recordings by Alon Goldstein (archived on the Wayback Machine)
Biography by Frank Salomon Associates

Israeli classical pianists
1970 births
Living people
Jewish classical pianists
Peabody Institute alumni
21st-century classical pianists
Centaur Records artists